Sphecodina abbottii, or Abbott's sphinx, is a moth of the family Sphingidae. The species was first described by William John Swainson in 1821.

Distribution 
It lives in eastern North America.

Biology 
Adults fly in May and June in the north, but have several generations in the south. Larvae feed on grapes (Vitis), Parthenocissus quinquefolia and Ampelopsis (Wagner 2005).

Description 
The underwings have a strong yellow band and in flight, the moth buzzes, appearing like a bee. The forewings are violet grey when fresh and have a "barklike pattern of swirling black lines" according to David Beadle and Seabrooke Leckie. At rest, they raise their abdomens and are well camouflaged on tree bark, looking like a broken branch (Wagner 2005).

Early instars are a pale greenish white, with at first a horn, but later a brown knob near the hind end. Final instars (75 mm in length) come in two patterns: one has brown bands such that there are ten large pale green spots on the back and an eyespot on the rear. This form may mimic grapes. Others are completely brown, with a wood-grain patterning, and with the rear eyespot (Wagner 2005). In the final instar the knob looks a lot like a vertebrate eye, down to the white reflection spot. If it is pinched or poked, the larva squeaks and bites at the attacker (Wagner 2005).

Gallery

References

Wagner, David L. 2005. Caterpillars of Eastern North America. Princeton Univ. Press. p. 270

External links

"Sphecodina abbottii The Abbott's Sphinx". Sphingidae of the Americas. Retrieved December 7, 2018.

Macroglossini
Moths of North America
Moths described in 1821